Older is the comparative form of "old".

It may also refer to:

Music: 
 Older (album), the third studio album from George Michael (released in 1996)
 "Older" (George Michael song)
 "Older", a song on the 1999 album Long Tall Weekend by They Might Be Giants
 “Older” a song by 5 Seconds Of Summer from 5SOS5
"Older" (Royseven song), Royseven's 2006 debut single
"Older" (Ben Platt song), a song by Ben Platt from his 2019 album Sing to Me Instead, also covered by Cliff Richard in his 2020 album Music... The Air That I Breathe
 "Older", a song on the 2007 album Coco by Colbie Caillat

People:
 Airin Older, American rock band Sugarcult's bass guitarist and supporting vocalist
 Charles Older (1917-2006), American World War II flying ace and judge in the Charles Manson trial
Daniel José Older, American fantasy writer and young adult fiction writer
 Fremont Older (1856–1935), American newspaperman and editor

See also
 Konrad IV the Older (c. 1384-1447), Roman Catholic Bishop of Wrocław and duke of multiple duchies